The 2014 Fiesta Bowl was a college football bowl game played on December 31, 2014, at University of Phoenix Stadium in Glendale, Arizona. The 44th Fiesta Bowl was one of the New Year's Bowls of the College Football Playoff. It was one of the 2014–15 bowl games that conclude the 2014 FBS football season. The game was sponsored by the Vizio consumer electronics company and is officially known as the Vizio Fiesta Bowl.

The game was televised on ESPN and ESPN Deportes, and broadcast on ESPN Radio and XM Satellite Radio, with  kickoff at 4:00 pm ET (2 pm MT).

Teams
The two participants for the game were determined by the College Football Playoff selection committee, and consisted of at-large selections and/or the highest ranked team from the "Group of Five" conferences.

This was the first overall meeting between these two teams.

Boise State

Arizona

Game summary

Scoring summary

Source:

Statistics

Fiesta Bowl history
Prior to the 2014–15 NCAA football season, the Fiesta Bowl became one of the six bowls that comprise the College Football Playoff (CFP). This game between Boise State and Arizona ended the Fiesta Bowl's 16-year tie-in with the Big 12; since 1999, the Big 12 champion had hosted the Fiesta Bowl when it is not playing in the national championship game.

The preceding Fiesta Bowl was actually played on New Year's Day, which naturally was also in 2014. There therefore were two 2014 Fiesta Bowls.

References

2014–15 NCAA football bowl games
Fiesta Bowl
2014 Fiesta Bowl
2014 Fiesta Bowl
December 2014 sports events in the United States
2014 in sports in Arizona